Bee is an unincorporated community in Dickenson County, Virginia, United States. Bee had a post office until it closed on October 1, 2005; it still has its own ZIP code, 24217.

Bee was named for Beatrice Owens.

References

Unincorporated communities in Dickenson County, Virginia
Unincorporated communities in Virginia